The 2009 UCI ProTour was the fifth series of the UCI ProTour. As in 2008, the races organized by the three Grand Tour organizers were not part of the ProTour. Rather than a ranking based only on the ProTour, the UCI designed a World Calendar, on which the Monument events and Grand Tours were included, with a corresponding 2009 UCI World Ranking.

The first race was the 2009 Tour Down Under in January, and the series ended with the 2009 GP Ouest-France in August.

2009 UCI ProTour races

Teams

References

External links
 

 
 ProTour
2009